Churchill Mining Plc is a mining corporation from London, United Kingdom. Its main activity is coal mining. It is listed on the Alternative Investment Market (AIM) of the London Stock Exchange since April 2005. The Supreme Court of Indonesia rejected an appeal by Churchill Mining to get compensation for a coal project that the company says was unfairly seized. Churchill Mining has a significant thermal coal development project located in the East Kutai Regency of Kalimantan, Indonesia.
It also is active in Australia. David F Quinlivan is the executive chairman of Churchill Mining. The company wants to be active in coal mining in Kutai National Park, which is a major menace to orangutans.

References 

Coal companies of the United Kingdom
Mining companies based in London